Wilson Siewari (born 16 July 1973) is an amateur Nigerian freestyle wrestler, who played for the men's super heavyweight category. He is a two-time medalist at the All-Africa Games, and trains under his personal and head coach Daniel Igali, a former Nigerian-born Canadian wrestler who won gold medals at the 2000 Summer Olympics in Sydney, and at the 2002 Commonwealth Games in Manchester.

Siewari represented Nigeria at the 2008 Summer Olympics in Beijing, where he competed for the 120 kg class in men's freestyle wrestling. He lost his first preliminary match to former Olympic champion and Russian-born wrestler David Musuľbes of Slovakia, who was able to score only nine points ahead of him in three successive periods.

References

External links
FILA Profile
NBC 2008 Olympics profile

1973 births
Living people
Olympic wrestlers of Nigeria
Wrestlers at the 2008 Summer Olympics
Nigerian male sport wrestlers
African Games medalists in wrestling
African Games gold medalists for Nigeria
African Games bronze medalists for Nigeria
Competitors at the 2003 All-Africa Games
Competitors at the 2007 All-Africa Games
20th-century Nigerian people
21st-century Nigerian people